Thomas Raymond Hyland was an Irish Dominican priest who served as Coadjutor Bishop for the Roman Catholic Archdiocese of Port of Spain, Trinidad and Tobago, Antilles ( and Titular Bishop of Evaria).

Hyland was born in Dublin, on November 3, 1837, in February 1856 he entered St. Mary's Priory, Tallaght, to become a Dominican. In 1864 he was ordained, a priest of the Order of Friars Preachers(Dominicans), completing his studies in Rome where he obtained a degree in theology. He served as prior to the Dominican house and Holy Cross Church in Tralee, Co. Kerry, when he was appointed Bishop.
Mgr. Hyland was ordained a Bishop at the Basilica of San Clemente, Rome, in 1882.

Hyland died on October 8, 1884, in Trinidad, after contracting typhoid.

References

1837 births
1884 deaths
Irish Dominicans
Irish expatriate Catholic bishops
Dominican bishops
Deaths from typhoid fever